Warm Valley is an album by American jazz trumpeter Art Farmer recorded in New York in 1982 and originally released on the Concord label.

Reception

Scott Yanow of Allmusic said: "The second of flugelhornist Art Farmer's two Concord albums is the equal of his first... Art Farmer is heard in prime form, playing in his appealing lyrical bop style".

Track listing
 "Moose the Mooche" (Charlie Parker) - 4:31   
 "And Now There's You" (Fred Hersch) - 5:09   
 "Three Little Words" (Bert Kalmar, Harry Ruby) - 4:49   
 "Eclypso" (Tommy Flanagan) - 5:28   
 "Sad to Say" (Benny Golson) - 5:34   
 "Upper Manhattan Medical Group" (Billy Strayhorn) - 5:41   
 "Warm Valley" (Duke Ellington) - 7:52

Personnel
Art Farmer - flugelhorn
Fred Hersch - piano
Ray Drummond - bass 
Akira Tana - drums

References 

Concord Records albums
Art Farmer albums
1983 albums